The New England Woman's Press Association (NEWPA) was founded by six Boston newspaper women in 1885 and incorporated in 1890. By the turn of the century it had over 150 members. NEWPA sought not only to bring female colleagues together and further their careers in a male-dominated field, but to use the power of the press for the good of society. The group raised funds for charity and supported women's suffrage and other political causes.

NEWPA was a charter member of both the General Federation of Women's Clubs and the National Federation of Press Women, among other organizations. Notable members included Lucy Stone, Julia Ward Howe, and Josephine St. Pierre Ruffin. Its last meeting was held in 1982.

History

Founding 

In November 1885, Marion A. McBride of the Boston Post sent out a call to other Boston newspaper women to establish a press association. McBride had already been involved in the founding of the Illinois Woman's Press Association and the National Woman's Press Association. Boston was a logical choice for another such group. With 9 daily newspapers and 19 weeklies, it was one of the busiest media centers in the country, but few of its newspapers hired women full time. Most women in the field worked as part-time correspondents and contributors. Their professional opportunities were limited, and they were often treated disrespectfully by their male colleagues.

On November 17, six women met at the office of Boston Herald reporter Sallie Joy White and formed the New England Woman's Press Association (NEWPA). Besides McBride and White, the other women were Helen M. Winslow of the Boston Daily Advertiser, Grace W. Soper of the Boston Daily Journal, Estelle M. Hatch (later Estelle M. H. Merrill) of the Boston Globe, and freelance journalist Cora Stuart Wheeler. White was chosen to be the first president and Hatch the first secretary.

The group met at the headquarters of the Woman's Journal until it outgrew that space and moved to the Parker House Hotel.

Mission and membership 

Over the next year, Hatch recruited a dozen more women to the organization. Alice Stone Blackwell of the Woman's Journal headed a committee that drew up a constitution and bylaws. To make clear that NEWPA was a professional association and not a social club, membership was limited to women living in New England who were "regularly and professionally connected with the press of New England, either as writers, editors, business managers, or correspondents—all, in short, for whom work on the press is a vocation, and not an avocation, a breadwinning occupation, and not an amusement." The group was incorporated on September 15, 1890. Starting in 1891, associate members were admitted, but not allowed to vote. 

Most of NEWPA's members were from the Boston area; others hailed from Maine, New Hampshire, Rhode Island, Vermont, and Nova Scotia. They included proprietors of local newspapers such as the Winthrop Visitor, editors of household, fashion, society, art, and literature departments, and freelance journalists who contributed to many different newspapers and magazines. Lillian A. Lewis, the first African-American woman reporter in Boston, made national headlines when she was admitted to the association in 1889. In the 1920s, NEWPA began accepting radio script writers, public relations writers, playwrights, and other "kindred women writers." The association maintained an average of more than 120 members until the mid-1940s.

NEWPA's constitution served as a model for many other women's press organizations over the next twenty years; for example, the Pacific Coast Woman's Press Association, founded in 1890, modeled its constitution after NEWPA's, and went on to become a leader of the women's movement in California. NEWPA's object was "to promote acquaintance and good-fellowship among newspaper women" and to use the power of the press to promote "good objects in social, philanthropic, and reformatory lines." In other words, it was a professional association, but one that aimed to make a positive difference in the community. As such, it was  part of the women's club movement. It became a charter member of the General Federation of Women's Clubs in 1890; the International Federation of Women's Press Clubs in 1891; the Massachusetts Federation of Women's Clubs in 1895; and the National Federation of Press Women in 1938.

Social and professional activities 

For the first few years, NEWPA held literary and business meetings twice a month, elections each November, and an outing each spring. They invited prominent authors and newspaper women such as Jane Cunningham Croly, Amelia Edwards, and Frances H. Burnett to speak about their work. Each February, male friends and relatives of members were invited to a "Gentlemen's Night" at the Hotel Vendome, featuring guest speakers such as Mayor Josiah Quincy. One member wrote in 1901, "However busy a newspaper woman may be the rest of the year, on gentlemen's night she lays aside all care, puts on her most becoming gown, and consigns to oblivion assignments, hurry calls for copy, and all the rest of the daily routine." They also hosted special events, such as authors' readings, teas, and receptions. During World War I the association began holding fewer social events, but continued holding monthly business and literary meetings. 

NEWPA established the Woman's Press Bureau in 1888 to help members find work. On February 11, 1894, they called attention to the work of women journalists by publishing a special "women's edition" of the Boston Post, "written, edited, and put out entirely by women." In the 1930s and 40s, NEWPA regularly broadcast shows on WEEI and WORL. Starting in the 1930s they also published a monthly bulletin. Annual workshops offered expertise on such topics as "Writing a Feature Column" and "Editing Winter Sports."

In 1946 NEWPA established an annual awards competition, with several categories such as news story, feature story, and "article or column of special interest to women." The New England Newspaper Woman of the Year award was added in 1951; recipients included Catherine Coyne of the Boston Herald, Mary Crewmen of the Boston Globe, and Mary Handy of the Christian Science Monitor.

Charitable and reform efforts 

In its early years, NEWPA was active in community affairs and politics. On January 18, 1887, the same day its constitution and bylaws were adopted, the group was addressed by "Mme. Charpiot," superintendent of the Home for Intemperate Women, who spoke of the need for matrons at Boston's police stations. Marion McBride had first spoken to Ms. Charpiot about this issue in 1886. She recalled later:

I told her I had determined to take it up and not lay it down until we had police matrons, not only for the city, but for the State as well. I went to police headquarters and got from the books the numbers of women arrested in 1885 and other facts and figures which I sent out at once to the leading papers in the State and to papers in Chicago, St. Louis, San Francisco and New Orleans.

In February, the "lady newspaper men" of NEWPA voted to show their support for the movement by signing a petition to the state legislature. A few days later, a short article in the Boston Globe reminded readers of the need for police matrons, and encouraged activists to keep the pressure on city and state officials. NEWPA's reporters and editors continued to call the public's attention to the issue over the next few months. By early May the legislature had passed a bill to appoint police matrons in Massachusetts cities and establish a house of detention for women in Boston. McBride attributed the success of the movement to the "kindness and courage" of the Boston press.

The association campaigned for international copyright laws in 1889, and for "clean journalism" at the turn of the century. During the Panic of 1893 it formed a benevolent society, "Samaritania," which raised money for the poor and established a fund for journalists in need. They organized authors' readings, auctions, and other fundraising events, and sponsored a hospital bed for women writers at Lynn Hospital. In 1914, NEWPA marched in the Boston suffrage parade, and in 1919 Dr. Grace E. Cross represented NEWPA at the National Woman's Party demonstration in Washington, D.C.

NEWPA was far less politically active during the "women's liberation" movement of the 1960s and 70s. The association took no formal position on the Equal Rights Amendment, for example, issued no petitions, and sent no representatives to demonstrations. One former president, Muriel Knight, said members were too busy to devote much time to activism, while another, Evelena Hudson, attributed the change to conservative leadership.

Later years 

Membership declined over the years due to competition from other groups such as the Society of Professional Journalists (SPJ), American Women in Radio & Television (AWRT), and Women in Communications, Inc. (WICI). In an attempt to attract new members, NEWPA began admitting men in the early 1970s. Attendance continued to decline, and fewer meetings were held. The association held its last annual meeting in 1982.

Presidents 

 Sallie Joy White, 1885-1890
 Estelle M. Hatch, 1891-1893
 Helen M. Winslow, 1894-1895
 May Alden Ward, 1896-1897
 Elizabeth Merritt Gosse, 1898
 Nella I. Daggett, 1899-1900
 Annie G. Murray, 1901-1902
 Emeline Carr Ricker, 1903-1904
 Allie A. Whitaker, 1905
 Kate Tannatt Woods, 1906
 Sallie Joy White, 1907-1908
 Eleanor W. F. Bates, 1908 (interim)
 Bessie Brown Cobb, 1908-1910
 Ida May Pierce, 1911-1912
 Myra B. Lord, 1913-15
 M. Agnes Dalrymple Bishop, 1916
 Grace M. Burt, 1917-1918
 Rose Moore Strong, 1919-1920
 Jessie L. Leonard, 1921-1922
 Annie Judson Hannigan, 1923-1924
 Norah Johnson Barbour, 1925-1926
 Helena B. Shipman, 1927-1928
 Helena C. Mahoney, 1929-1930
 Mildred Buchanan Flagg, 1931
 Muriel Knight, 1972-1973
 Evelena Hudson, 1973-1974

Notable members 

 Martha Violet Ball (1811–1894), charter member
 Anna Barrows (1861-1948), home economics expert
 Isabel Barrows (1845-1913), ophthalmologist
 Cynthia Holmes Belcher (1827-?), journalist
 Mary Agnes Dalrymple Bishop (1857–1934), Executive Committee
 Alice Stone Blackwell (1857-1950), feminist, suffragist
 Mary Elizabeth Blake (1840-1907), poet
 Mabel Louise Blodgett (1869-1959), novelist, children's book author
 Helen A. Clarke (1860-1926), literary critic and editor
 Katherine E. Conway (1853-1927), editor of the Pilot
 Mary Catherine Crowley (1856-?), Catholic and children's writer
 Ellen B. Dietrick (1847-1895), suffragist and author
 Mildred Buchanan Flagg (1886-1980), writer, lecturer, and clubwoman
 Lavinia Stella Goodwin (1833-1911), charter member
 Kate E. Griswold (born ca. 1869), publisher of Profitable Advertising 
 Louise Imogen Guiney (1861-1920), poet
 Estelle M. Hatch (1858-1908), NEWPA co-founder and second president
 Julia Ward Howe (1819-1910), author and activist
 Muriel Knight (?-2009), WILD reporter, first African-American president of NEWPA
 Lillian A. Lewis (1861-?), Boston's first African-American woman journalist
 Mary J. Lincoln (1844-1921), cooking teacher, cookbook author
 Marion A. McBride (?-1909), co-founder of three press associations
 Louise Chandler Moulton (1835-1908), poet
 Grace Atkinson Oliver (1844-1899), author, advocate of women's rights
 Annie Stevens Perkins (born 1868), writer
 Charlotte Porter (1857-1942), literary critic and editor
 Ella Farman Pratt (1837–1907), editor of Wide Awake
 Josephine St. Pierre Ruffin (1842-1924), civil rights leader and suffragist
 Emily McGary Selinger (1848–1927), painter, writer, poet, educator
 Harriette Lucy Robinson Shattuck (1850-1937), author, writer on parliamentary law, suffragist
 Lucy Stone (1818-1893), abolitionist and women's rights activist
 Evelyn Greenleaf Sutherland (1855-1908), drama critic and playwright
 Clara Augusta Jones Trask (1839-1905), freelance writer, novelist
 Kate Vannah (1855-1933), journalist, songwriter
 Adelaide Cilley Waldron (1843-1909), author, editor, clubwoman
 May Alden Ward (1853-1918), author, lecturer, clubwoman
 Emily Greene Wetherbee (1839-1937), journalist, schoolteacher, and poet
 Cora Stuart Wheeler (1852-1897) poet, art critic
 Sallie Joy White (1847-1909), first full-time woman reporter for a Boston newspaper
 Sibyl Wilbur (1871-1946), journalist and biographer 
 S. Fannie Gerry Wilder (1850-1923), author
 Helen M. Winslow (1851-1938), journalist, poet, novelist
 Kate Tannatt Woods (1836-1910), author, editor, journalist, clubwoman

Notes

References

Citations

Bibliography

Further reading  
 New England Woman's Press Association Papers, Massachusetts Historical Society, Boston, Massachusetts.
 
  "Ward, Mrs. May Alden", p. 748; "Wheeler, Mrs. Cora Stuart", p. 763; "Winslow, Miss Helen M.", p. 791; "Woods, Mrs. Kate Tannatt", p. 797. 
 

American press clubs
History of women in the United States
1885 establishments in the United States
1982 disestablishments in the United States
Women's clubs in the United States
Defunct clubs and societies of the United States
Organizations for women writers
History of women in Massachusetts
Women in Boston